Giuseppe Gonzaga (20 March 1690 – 16 August 1746) was the last reigning Duke of Guastalla and a member of the House of Gonzaga.

Early life 
He was the second son of Vincenzo Gonzaga, Duke of Guastalla and his second wife, Princess Maria Vittoria Gonzaga of Guastalla (1659-1707). Giuseppe was mentally handicapped.
When his elder brother Duke Antonio Ferrante died in an accident in 1729, Giuseppe was the only remaining male member of the Gonzaga family, so he became duke.

Marriage 
Giuseppe would probably never have married, but when he became duke a marriage was arranged in 1731 with the sixteen-year-old Princess Eleonore von Schleswig-Holstein-Sonderburg-Wiesenburg (1715–1760), daughter of Duke Leopold of Schleswig-Holstein-Sonderburg-Wiesenburg and his wife, Princess Maria Elisabeth of Liechtenstein (1683-1744). She was also granddaughter of Duchess Karolina of Legnica-Brieg. The marriage remained childless.

Duchy 
During the War of Polish Succession the Duchy was occupied by the French for four years, between 1734 and 1738.
When Giuseppe Gonzaga died in 1746, Italy was again a theater of war in the War of Austrian Succession, and the Duchy was annexed by Austria.
Two years later, in the Treaty of Aix-La-Chapelle, Guastalla was ceded to the Spanish, together with the Duchy of Parma and Piacenza, with which it was merged.

Ancestry

Sources 
 

1690 births
1746 deaths
Giuseppe Maria
Giuseppe Maria
17th-century Italian nobility
18th-century Italian nobility